Eumir Felix de los Santos Marcial (born October 29, 1995) is a Filipino boxer. While representing the Philippines as an amateur, he won a silver medal at the 2019 World Championships and bronze at the 2020 Summer Olympics, both in the middleweight division.

Amateur career
Marcial won the 2011 International Boxing Association (amateur) Junior World Championships in three years after he took up training for the first time. He was awarded the Best Asia Youth Boxer of the Year in 2013. Marcial won the gold medal in his weight class at the 2015 Southeast Asian Games, and earned a silver medal in the ASBC Asian Confederation Boxing Championships."

At the 2019 AIBA World Boxing Championships in Ekaterinburg, Russia, Marcial settled for silver in the middleweight category losing to Russian boxer Gleb Bakshi  in the final bout.

He failed to qualify for the 2016 Summer Olympics in Rio de Janeiro. However he managed to qualify for the 2020 Summer Olympics which was later postponed to 2021 due to the COVID-19 pandemic.

He qualified for the Middleweight event for the 2020 Summer Olympics. He faced off against Algerian boxer Younes Nemouchi on Round 16 as he won the round easily by a TKO. He advanced to fight Armenian boxer Arman Darchinyan by a KO after Darchinyan fell from Marcial's punch. Marcial was able to advance to the Semi-Finals against Ukrainian boxer Oleksandr Khyzhniak and lost to a 3–2 split decision. Marcial brought home the first Bronze Medal for a Filipino Boxer since 1992 by Roel Velasco.

Professional career
As early as 2020, Marcial has been receiving major offers from professional boxing promoters, encouraging him to turn pro. Among the organizations that caught his interest is MP Promotions of Manny Pacquiao. The offers are significant enough, which promises Marcial as much as "tens of millions of pesos" before even each match begins, to warrant a response from the Association of Boxing Alliances in the Philippines to appeal to promoters to allow him to compete in the 2020 Summer Olympics, something that Marcial promised to his father. In July 2020, Marcial turned pro and signed in with MP Promotions although he has pledged to continue to represent the Philippines in international amateur competitions such as the Southeast Asian Games and the Summer Olympics.

Marcial signed with the Premier Boxing Champions (PBC) and his professional match will be a four-round middleweight bout against Andrew Whitfield from Lewiston, Idaho. The bout will be part of a PBC event to be held on December 16, 2020 at the Microsoft Theater in Los Angeles. For two months prior to the fight, Marcial trained under Freddie Roach at Wild Card Boxing Club.

Professional boxing record

Personal life

Marcial is the youngest among five siblings. His father Eulalio is a boxing coach who trained him since the age of seven. His cousin Anthony Marcial is a professional boxer, who has also represented the Philippines at the 2006 Asian Games. His eldest brother Eliver died in October 2020.

Marcial is married to Princess Jenniel Galarpe, a fellow boxer from Cagayan de Oro belonging to a family of boxers, whom he tied the knot after his stint in the 2021 Olympics.

In popular media
In 2021, Marcial made a virtual appearance in Pinoy Big Brother: Kumunity Season 10 when he gave a message of luck to the Celebrity housemates prior to their land swimming competition in the Pinoy Big Brother Games 2021.

References

External links 
 
 

1995 births
Filipino male boxers
Living people
Sportspeople from Zamboanga City
Boxers at the 2018 Asian Games
Asian Games bronze medalists for the Philippines
Asian Games medalists in boxing
Medalists at the 2018 Asian Games
Southeast Asian Games gold medalists for the Philippines
Southeast Asian Games medalists in boxing
Competitors at the 2015 Southeast Asian Games
Competitors at the 2017 Southeast Asian Games
Competitors at the 2019 Southeast Asian Games
AIBA World Boxing Championships medalists
Light-welterweight boxers
Welterweight boxers
Middleweight boxers
Philippine Air Force personnel
Boxers at the 2020 Summer Olympics
Medalists at the 2020 Summer Olympics
Olympic bronze medalists for the Philippines
Olympic medalists in boxing
Olympic boxers of the Philippines
Competitors at the 2021 Southeast Asian Games